The Ask and the Answer is a 2009 young-adult science fiction novel written by British-American author Patrick Ness. It was published on 4 May 2009 by Walker Books. It is the second book in the Chaos Walking series, preceded by The Knife of Never Letting Go and followed by Monsters of Men. The story follows Todd Hewitt, a 13-year-old boy held captive by the mayor of New Prentisstown.

Plot summary

Resuming directly after The Knife of Never Letting Go, Todd Hewitt is captured by the Mayor's army in Haven, renamed New Prentisstown, but his only concern is for Viola. He is forced to live in the town's clock tower with the previous Mayor, Con Ledger. Ledger explains that Haven discovered a cure for Noise, but Mayor Prentiss (now President Prentiss) has confiscated it for sole use by leaders of New Prentisstown. He has also separated the males and females, and imprisons all domestic Spackle who live in the town. The Mayor organises a speech as the rest of his army marches in. He expresses his displeasure at the easiness of taking over, claiming that the people will pay for the lack of war.

Elsewhere, Viola awakens. Likewise her thoughts are for Todd. She is in a house of healing, a 'clinic' staffed by female healers, as opposed to male doctors, for her gunshot wound. She meets Mistress Coyle, the head of the facility, who also has previous political and activist ties. Viola also meets the apprentices Corinne Wyatt and Maddy as she recovers.

Todd is made to work with the enslaved Spackle of New Prentisstown with Davy Prentiss. Todd hopes that by complying he is ensuring Viola's health and safety, while the Mayor hopes that Davy will become a better person with Todd's influence. Todd is disgusted at the treatment of the Spackle, yet Davy is proud of his authority. As the Spackle speak via Noise, cure has been placed into the Spackle's food to prevent communication.

Back at the house of healing, Viola finally recovers enough to help Mistress Coyle and begins an apprenticeship as a healer. However, one night Mistress Coyle and many other healers disappear. They have led a group of women out of New Prentisstown to form a resistance movement, reconvened from the time of the Spackle War, known as "The Answer", to carry out a series of bombings in the city.

Davy and Todd receive orders to brand the Spackle with numbered metal bands. Though Todd is shocked by this unethical practice, he wants to ensure Viola's safety. During the branding, Davy strangles a Spackle around the neck with a band, killing it, to the disgust of Todd. However, Todd continues the task without argument.

One of several large bombings occur both in town and the Spackle reserve. Todd, trying to redeem himself, saves a Spackle banded with the number 1017, who is ungrateful. Mayor Prentiss sets up a counter-intelligence unit called "The Ask". He promotes Todd and Davy into this unit, where New Prentisstown residents are captured and tortured for information on The Answer. The next morning, Viola finds that the House of Healing is almost completely empty. The rest have gone to join the Answer. Mistress Coyle returns to recruit Viola, who feels forced to join, knowing about Mayor Prentiss' tortures.

Todd realizes that he must take sides. At The Answer's headquarters outside of town, Viola learns about the bombings and participates in an attack. An older teenager, Lee, befriends her. He is intent on avenging his family, who have been taken by The Ask.

A large bombing occurs outside of town, and Todd finds that all the Spackle have been killed in a mass genocide - the only Spackle to survive is 1017, who angrily attacks Todd and leaves. 1017 reveals he can freely use his Noise; he has been starving himself to prevent taking the cure. Horrified at the genocide, the perpetrator still unknown, the Mayor teaches Todd to chant 'I am the Circle and the Circle is me' to calm his Noise.

Todd is surprised to find that he and Davy now share a friendship. Davy returns Todd's mother's stolen diary. Meanwhile, Viola learns of a planned bombing in New Prentisstown that could harm Todd. Viola and Lee arrive at the tower to rescue him. Viola notices that there is something darker to his personality, but still urges Todd to leave with them, warning that the attack will come from the south. Suddenly Ledger appears, armed, revealing his secret loyalty to Prentiss. While threatening them he finds a self-arming bomb in Viola's bag. Too late, Ledger attempts to throw it away, but it explodes, killing him and injuring Todd, Viola and Lee.

Mayor Prentiss captures the three. Viola is interrogated and tortured, with Todd watching from a soundproof room. Mayor Prentiss wants to know where The Answer will attack from, drowning Viola, who refuses to answer. Unable to watch, Todd screams that the Answer is attacking from the south. The Mayor thanks Todd, and leaves to organise his army. Todd realizes where his duty lies and formulates a plan to stop the Mayor with the help of Ivan and other personnel.

Ivan and the guards agree to help Todd rescue Lee and Viola. Lee hurries back to the Answer, while the others go to stop the Mayor. At the cathedral, the Mayor disables the entire group with his Noise and captures Viola. The Mayor still wants Todd to join him despite his betrayal; he reveals that he has never taken the cure, instead training his Noise via the 'I am the circle and the circle is me' chant to silence, which also allows him to attack and control others with his mind. Davy arrives to tell his father that the Answer army is coming, and requires orders. Suddenly, a second scout ship, like the one Viola crashed in, flies in near New Prentisstown. In desperation, Todd holds Davy at gunpoint, threatening to kill him if the Mayor does not release Viola. Shockingly, the Mayor drops Viola and fires his gun, quickly killing Davy. Davy reveals that he had shot Ben, Todd's guardian. He begs for forgiveness but dies before Todd can answer.

In anger, and quick to learn, Todd uses his own Noise as a weapon with Viola's name to overcome the Mayor. He ties him up in the cathedral while Viola goes to meet with the scout ship. Suddenly, a horn sounds to warn of an army of Spackle marching towards the city, seeking revenge for the genocide. With no alternative, Todd releases Mayor Prentiss to enlist help; hoping that he is not making the biggest mistake of his life. Released from his bonds, the Mayor claims that what has come to New World is what men are born for: war.

Reception

The Ask and the Answer received largely positive reviews from critics. Publishers Weekly praised the brilliant cast, and believed it to be "among the best YA science fiction novels of the year", including it in their best books of 2009, while Anita Barnes Lowen from Children's Literature labelled the book "a stunning not-to-be-missed science fiction adventure." Independent on Sunday said that "... it is every bit as ambitious as the first book but the ambition is easily matched by the execution, with powerful prose and tight plotting that pull the reader on at a terrifying speed."

Kirkus Reviews noted that the plot was "breathless... with heartbreakingly real characters" and the Costa Book Awards 2009 judges recognised the novel as "a strikingly original and compelling work."

Awards

 2009 Costa Children's Book Award
Runners up
 2009 Teenage Book of the Year Award shortlist
 2009 Booktrust Teenage Prize longlist
 UKLA Children's Book Award longlist

References 

2009 British novels
British fantasy novels
British young adult novels
British science fiction novels
Children's science fiction novels
2009 science fiction novels
Novels set on fictional planets
Novels by Patrick Ness
Walker Books books